James Johnston Robinson (15 November 1881 – 5 November 1947) was an Australian rules footballer who played with Carlton in the Victorian Football League (VFL).

Family
The son of George Robinson (1861-1946), and Jane Emiline Robinson (1864-1918), née Milson, James Johnston Robinson was born at Seymour on 15 November 1881.

He married Mary Anne Maud Martell (1883-1957) on 10 September 1912.

Football
Recruited from a local Metropolitan Junior League team, Stanley United Football Club — its home ground was at Royal Park, Melbourne — he played his only game for the Carlton First XVIII (replacing Charlie Maplestone at full-back) against St Kilda, at Princes Park, on 25 May 1901, at the age of 19.

Death
A retired railway employee, Robinson died (suddenly) at Seymour on 5 November 1947.

Notes

External links 

Jimmy Robinson's profile at Blueseum

1881 births
Australian rules footballers from Victoria (Australia)
Carlton Football Club players
1947 deaths